Barrington Public Schools is a public primary and secondary education school district located in Barrington, a suburban town located in Bristol County, Rhode Island. It consists of four elementary schools, and a single middle school and high school.

Elementary schools 
The four elementary schools in the Barrington Public Schools district are:
 Nayatt Elementary School
 Primrose Hill Elementary School
 Sowams Elementary School
 Hampden Meadows School

Middle and high school

Barrington Middle School
Barrington Middle School (founded as West Barrington Junior High) is the only middle school in Barrington, serving about 850 students during the 2017 school year. Barrington Middle School was constructed in 1959, and enlarged in 1969. The Barrington School Committee has started the construction of a new middle school building on the existing campus, at upwards of 36 million dollars. In 2014, Barrington Middle School was named a National Blue Ribbon School. Just after the end of the 2018-2019 school year, the school building was torn down to finish the construction of a new middle school that had been under construction for about a year. The new building costed $68 million to build.

Barrington High School

Barrington High School is the only high school in Barrington. Constructed in 1951, amidst a period of population growth in Barrington, it has been named a National Blue Ribbon School and has been ranked as the number one high school in Rhode Island by U.S. News & World Report.

References

Barrington, Rhode Island
School districts in Rhode Island
Education in Bristol County, Rhode Island